Thelonious Monk Nonet Live In Paris 1967 is a live jazz album by Thelonious Monk on France's Concert Records LP FC-113, released in 1988.

Recorded at "Salle Pleyel", Paris, France, November 3, 1967, Thelonious Monk Nonet Live in Paris is a concert recording of a rare large group that Monk assembled for the European tour, which featured the addition of some of the top horn players in jazz.

Criticism
Jazz critic Scott Yanow wrote of the album: “a rare recording (of a large group) making it a historical curiosity; more importantly the music (featuring six originals) is excellent."

Background
Monk organized this concert in an unusual way. The musicians joined the original quartet by coming on one by one to join in.

Track listing
"Epistrophy" (Monk, Clarke) – 9:45
"Oska-T" (Monk) – 15:19
"Evidence" (Monk) – 14:24
"Blue Monk" (Monk) – 5:10
"Epistropy (reprise)" (Monk, Clarke) – 1:20

CD Reissue
The CD reissue of this LP (titled "The Nonet –Live") is also a French release, on the label “Le Jazz”, item number — CD 7.  The release date was Nov 10, 1993 and it contains two additional tracks with a running length of 67:37

"Ruby, My Dear" (Monk) – 7:40
"We See" (Monk) – 13:59
"Epistrophy" (Monk, Clarke) – 9:45
"Oska-T" (Monk) – 15:19
"Evidence" (Monk) – 14:24
"Blue Monk" (Monk) – 5:10
"Epistropy (reprise)" (Monk, Clarke) – 1:20

Personnel
Thelonious Monk -  piano
Charlie Rouse – tenor sax
Larry Gales – bass
Ben Riley – drums
Ray Copeland - trumpet
Johnny Griffin – tenor sax
Jimmy Cleveland – trombone
Phil Woods – alto sax
Clark Terry – trumpet

Production
Alexandre Noble, Joël Arlot, Etienne Lacoste: Coordination
Michel Noble: Cover – interpretation of “Les petits chevaux jaunes” by Franz Marc
Jacques Chesnel: Artistic collaboration
Francis Paudras: Photography
Frank Dufour, Gilbert Taïeb: Montage
Francis Paudras: Cover concept
Yves Builly, Monique Vaysse: Research
Acknowledgements/Appreciation to André Francis

References

France's Concert Records live albums
Thelonious Monk live albums
1988 live albums